USS Jefferson was a brig in the United States Navy during the War of 1812. She was named for Founding Father and third U.S. president Thomas Jefferson.  Jefferson was built at Sackett's Harbor, New York, for service in Commodore Isaac Chauncey's fleet on Lake Ontario and launched 7 April 1814. She was manned by a crew from sloop of war  which had been laid up at Baltimore because of the British blockade of Chesapeake Bay. Comdr. Charles G. Ridgeley was her captain.  Notable Master Gunner George Marshall a warrant officer, was responsible for the ship's artillery.  Marshall was also from the sloop of war .   

Most of the guns for the new American ships had not reached Sackett's Harbor by 19 May when the British fleet arrived off the American base and began a strict blockade. Jefferson finally sailed with Chauncey's fleet on 31 July and arrived off Niagara on 5 August. Eleven days prior to the arrival of the USS Jefferson the Battle of Lundy's Lane occurred at Niagara Falls. It was one of the bloodiest battles of the war, and one of the deadliest battles ever fought in Canada,  
The Siege of Fort Erie continued for a month.  

With  and  the Jefferson set up a blockade while Chauncey with the rest of the fleet sailed on to Kingston to challenge the main English squadron.  Several ships were blocked in the Niagara River.   The blockade also prevented British supplies and troops from entering the Niagara River at the Lake Ontario entrance.  Naval ships could not travel from Lake Ontario to Lake Erie because of Niagara Falls.  British ships would use a portage road traveling 11 miles to naval ships closer to Lake Erie.  The blockade stopped this crucial artery while the Siege of Fort Erie raged on aiding the United States.  The crews of the vessels gained experience in amphibious warfare.               

After remaining on blockade duty off Niagara for over a month, Jefferson sailed for Kingston to rejoin Chauncey.  The ship crew also captured several small British vessels. During the passage, on 12 September, a severe storm arose, which before abating three days later, almost swamped the brig. Ten of her guns were thrown overboard in the struggle to save the ship.

Jefferson rejoined her fleet on 17 September and operated with it during the remainder of the navigation season attempting to draw Sir James Yeo's ships into a decisive contest. Toward the end of November she was laid up for the winter. 

Peace obviated Jeffersons planned return to commission in the spring. She apparently remained in ordinary until sold on 30 April 1825.

References

Brigs of the United States Navy
War of 1812 ships of the United States
Great Lakes ships
Ships built in Sackets Harbor, New York
1814 ships
Ships named for Founding Fathers of the United States

Bibliography